Tchaikovsky Piano Concerto No. 2 may refer to
Piano Concerto No. 2 (Tchaikovsky), the second of piano concertos of Pyotr Ilyich Tchaikovsky
Tschaikovsky Piano Concerto No. 2 (ballet), a 1941 ballet by George Balanchine, to the above music.